= Pir Bakhir railway station =

Railway station in Pakistan

Coordinates: 27.814899°N 68.72169°E

General information
- Owner: Ministry of Railways

Other information
- Station code: PBKR

History
- Former names: Great Indian Peninsula Railway
Location

Pir Bakhir railway station (Urdu: پیر بخیر ریلوے اسٹیشن) is located in Pakistan.

== See also ==
- List of railway stations in Pakistan
- Pakistan Railways
